Yu Yong-hyeon (born 27 February 2000) is a South Korean footballer currently playing as a midfielder for Fagiano Okayama.

Club statistics
.

Notes

References

External links

2000 births
Living people
South Korean footballers
South Korean expatriate footballers
Association football midfielders
J2 League players
Fagiano Okayama players
South Korean expatriate sportspeople in Japan
Expatriate footballers in Japan